Mahonri A. Ngakuru (born 2 January 2000) is a New Zealand rugby union player who plays for  in the Bunnings NPC and Moana Pasifika in Super Rugby. His position is Lock.

Career 
Ngakuru was named in the  squad for the 2020 Mitre 10 Cup. He made his debut in Round 1 against  at Pukekohe Stadium, coming off the bench in a 24-41 win for the Mako. Ngakuru played another 4 games for Tasman during the season as the Mako went on to win their second premiership title in a row. Ngakuru was again named in the Tasman Mako squad for the 2021 Bunnings NPC.

References

External links
itsrugby.co.uk profile

New Zealand rugby union players
2000 births
Living people
People educated at Saint Kentigern College
Tasman rugby union players
Rugby union locks
Moana Pasifika players